Richard Hernanz is a former French slalom canoeist who competed at the international level from 1979 to 1981.

He won a silver medal in the C2 team event at the 1979 ICF Canoe Slalom World Championships in Jonquière.

His son Samuel has represented both France and Spain in canoe slalom.

References

French male canoeists
Living people
Year of birth missing (living people)
Medalists at the ICF Canoe Slalom World Championships